Zhukovsky is a rural locality (a khutor) in Sulyayevskoye Rural Settlement, Kumylzhensky District, Volgograd Oblast, Russia. The population was 89 as of 2010.

Geography 
The village is located in forest steppe, on Khopyorsko-Buzulukskaya Plain, on the bank of the Kumylga River.

References 

Rural localities in Kumylzhensky District